Bad for You Baby is the seventeenth and final solo album by Northern Irish blues guitarist and singer-songwriter Gary Moore.

Background
The album features a hard rock-influenced sound similar to the sound of the artist's releases over the previous several years. It includes covers of two songs best known for their versions done by Muddy Waters. The release also includes notable collaborative work with musicians Cassie Taylor and Otis Taylor. It is the last studio album released by Moore during his lifetime; he died on 6 February 2011.

Critical reception
The album has received positive critical reviews from publications such as Allmusic, with critic Hal Horowitz stating that Moore's "under-appreciated voice is strong and convincing on originals and covers" while the artist's "tough guitar lines" also have a "biting yet classy" sound.

Track listing

Bonus track

Personnel
Gary Moore – vocals, guitar, harmonica
Pete Rees – bass
Vic Martin – keyboards
Otis Taylor – banjo (on "Preacher Man Blues")
Cassie Taylor – backing vocals (on "Holding On" and "Preacher Man Blues")
Sam Kelly – drums

References

2008 albums
Gary Moore albums
Eagle Records albums